Colours is the third album by Finnish thrash metal band Stone, released in 1990. This is their first album with Nirri Niiranen, replacing original guitarist Jiri Jalkanen, who had been fired from the band just before the recording sessions started. Colours is considered to be more technical and experimental than Stone's first two albums, continuing the elements of progressive that the band had used on its predecessor No Anaesthesia!, and featuring more complexity and mid-paced tempos, as well as longer songs in length. It was remastered and re-issued by Megamania in 2003. The Japanese version had a redder pigment used on the album cover. An EP was released for the album track "Empty Suit".

Track listing

Personnel 
 Janne Joutsenniemi – bass, vocals
 Nirri Niiranen – guitar
 Roope Latvala – guitar
 Pekka Kasari – drums

Additional personnel
 Janne Kannas violin on "White Worms"
 Miika Uuksulainen cello on "White Worms"
 Sennu Laine cello on "White Worms"

Production
 Mikko Karmila – producer

Empty Suit EP 
A four-track EP was released for "Empty Suit" in 1990. The A-side contained two tracks from Colours, "Empty Suit" and "Friends", while the B-side contained two live tracks. The live performances on side B were taken from a show in Helsinki on 15 March 1990. This show was guitarist Jiri Jalkanen's final show with Stone before his departure from the band.

Charts

References 

1990 albums
Stone (band) albums